Virtual Boy Wario Land is a platforming video game developed and published by Nintendo for the Virtual Boy game system in 1995. It stars Wario, a treasure hunter who must find treasure and fight enemies to progress. Wario can jump and charge with his shoulder as basic techniques, though he can also equip special hats to gain things such as fire breathing and bull horns. He has the ability to enter the background at certain points, making use of the console's stereoscopic 3D effect. It was developed by Nintendo R&D1, containing a large portion of its staff, and features the red-and-black color scheme that is standard for Virtual Boy releases.

It received generally positive reception, particularly among retrospectives. It is regarded as one of the best games on the Virtual Boy, receiving praise for its gameplay and utilization of 3D depth, and criticism for its short length. It served as an inspiration for multiple games due to its background gimmick, including Donkey Kong Country Returns and Mutant Mudds.

Plot
Virtual Boy Wario Land stars Wario on a quest to find treasure in the Awazon. Witnessing strange creatures entering a secret cave behind a waterfall, he decided to follow them. Claiming their treasure vault as his own, he collapses through the floor and must fight his way back to the top.

The ending depends upon whether Wario found all additional treasure in the lower tunnels and the coins he has collected:
If Wario has not collected all 10 sigils that unlock the door to the treasure vault, he exits the cave in disappointment and notices that a gang of beavers has vandalized his airplane. Offering him an alternative vehicle in exchange for his coins, the beavers give him a ride depending on the amount he has collected, ranging from two fans to a bike, a dragon, or a new plane.
If the player has collected all ten sigils, Wario will be able to open the vault and claim its fortune, along with a magic carpet which flies him home as well as a magic bottle. If certain conditions regarding difficulties and playing time are met, he will be accompanied by a bunny girl and/or the final boss, a genie.

Gameplay

Virtual Boy Wario Land stars Wario on a quest to find treasure in the Awazon. Gameplay involves techniques such as jumping, charging, and throwing enemies and objects. The levels he explores are viewed from a sidescrolling perspective. He has the ability to jump into the background at special blocks. Similarly to Wario Land: Super Mario Land 3, featuring the ability to equip hats to gain new powers, which he loses if he takes damage or dies. These hats include an eagle hat that allows Wario to charge horizontally in mid-air, a dragon hat that breathes fire, and a bull hat that increases his power and adds horns. He can obtain a hat with all three abilities called the King Dragon Hat. In each stage, Wario must collect treasure and find a key to unlock the elevator to the next stage. Players can find different treasures hidden around the stages to increase their overall score. There are also mini-games in between stages in which Wario can gamble with the loot he has collected so far. Players fight bosses on occasion, which make use of the game's background gimmick.

Development and release 
Virtual Boy Wario Land was developed by Nintendo R&D1 and published by Nintendo. The game was originally named Wario Cruise, appearing with the name on the Virtual Boy system's box and in a Nintendo Power issue. Its development had a large allocation of R&D1's staff involved. The music and sound effects were composed by Kazumi Totaka, who ended his work with R&D1 with it. Totaka includes a song called "Totaka's Song", which he hides in most video games he composes. Like all other Virtual Boy games, Virtual Boy Wario Land uses a red-and-black color scheme and uses parallax, an optical trick used to simulate 3D. It was released on November 27, 1995, in North America and December 1, 1995, in Japan.

Reception and legacy 

Virtual Boy Wario Land garnered mostly positive reviews upon release, with most critiques aimed at the Virtual Boy hardware itself. Los Angeles Timess Aaron Curtis found the game enjoyable, but did not like the Virtual Boy's visual style. Rocky Mountain Newss Joel Easley felt that its use of 3D demonstrated the Virtual Boy's possibilities, a sentiment shared by AllGames Scott Alan Marriott. GamePros Wes Nihei praised it for its sound effects and character sprite quality, regarding it as the best game on the platform. Next Generation felt that while it had appeal to more "hardcore" Mario fans, it was not very advanced in comparison to older Mario games. They felt that the 3D mechanic did not add much to the game.

Retrospective criticism for Virtual Boy Wario Land has been more favorable. It has been named as one of the best games on the Virtual Boy by GamesRadar+, Nintendo Power and Retronauts, the latter of which noted that it should be remade for a different platform. GamesRadar+ writer Mikel Reparaz called it a "legitimately awesome" platformer, despite its lacking "3D" gimmick. They noted that Virtual Boy Wario Land was the kind of game that fans wanted the fellow Virtual Boy game Mario Clash to be. Destructoid and IGN similarly hoped to see it re-released, specifically for the Nintendo 3DS. Kotaku staff felt that it was unappreciated at release due to its platform. Plays Dave Halverson returned to play Virtual Boy Wario Land often, praising it for not getting tiresome to replay. Retro Gamer felt that the background gimmick helped enhance an otherwise "traditional" platformer. ABC's Good Game also felt that it could have done more with its visuals, nonetheless calling it the best Virtual Boy game. Nintendo World Reports Neal Ronaghan enjoyed the background gimmick but felt it did not do as well as it could to explore the concept. They also felt that it served as a demonstration of what a "traditional" game could look like with the 3D gimmicks. GameZone felt that its cavernous setting helped the Virtual Boy emphasize subtle visual details, considering it worth buying a Virtual Boy for this game.

Virtual Boy Wario Lands background gimmick served as inspiration for multiple developers, including Retro Studios in the 2010 Wii game Donkey Kong Country Returns and Jool Watsham in the 2011 3DS game Mutant Mudds.

Notes

References

External links 
  

1995 video games
Nintendo Research & Development 1 games
Single-player video games
Video games developed in Japan
Video games scored by Kazumi Totaka
Virtual Boy games
Wario Land